Mictopsichia panamae is a species of moth of the family Tortricidae. It is found in Panama.

The wingspan is about 15.5 mm. The ground colour of the forewings is yellowish orange, preserved in the form of groups of dots, which are rust orange terminally and paler at the refractive subterminal line and at the costa. The streaks are yellow orange. The hindwings are pale orange with two pale brownish fasciae in the apical area.

Etymology
The name refers to the country of origin of the species, Panama.

References

Moths described in 2009
Mictopsichia
Moths of Central America
Taxa named by Józef Razowski